Cape Well-met is a dark, conspicuous headland near the center of the north side of Vega Island, close south of Trinity Peninsula. Cape Well-met was discovered and named by the Swedish Antarctic Expedition, 1901–04, and commemorates the long delayed union at this point of a relief party under Dr. J. Gunnar Andersson and the winter party under Dr. Otto Nordenskjold after twenty months of enforced separation.

Headlands of Trinity Peninsula